TJ Jiskra Ústí nad Orlicí is a Czech football club located in the town of Ústí nad Orlicí in the Pardubice Region. It currently plays in the Bohemian Football League, which is the third level of Czech football.

The team played in the Czech Fourth Division for five seasons between 2002 and 2007 before being relegated. After two seasons, the club returned to the Fourth Division in 2009, where it has since remained.

The club reached the second round of the 2010–11 Czech Cup before being beaten at home by top-flight team SK Sigma Olomouc in front of over one thousand spectators.

Current squad

References

External links
 Official website 

Football clubs in the Czech Republic
Association football clubs established in 1904
Ústí nad Orlicí District